Sideritis leucantha is a plant species in the genus Sideritis.

Hypolaetin 8-glucoside, a glycoside of hypolaetin, can be found in Sideritis leucantha.

References

External links

leucantha
Plants described in 1797
Taxa named by Antonio José Cavanilles